Jeanne Munn Bracken is an American author and a retired librarian. She is known for her non-fiction work, including Children With Cancer: A Comprehensive Reference Guide for Parents.

Biography 
Bracken graduated from the University of New Hampshire in 1968 with a major in German Language and Literature and a minor in Speech and Drama. She earned her masters in Library Science from Simmons College in 1971. Bracken went on to work at the UNH Dimond Library, at the Boston University School of Medicine Library, at the Research Library at Arthur D. Little, Inc., at the Acton Memorial Library, and at the Lincoln Public Library. Bracken retired as a librarian in 2006.

Bracken's daughter, Lisa, was diagnosed and successfully treated for cancer when she was a child. During this time, Bracken researched cancer which led to her writing her first book.

Writing
Bracken's guide, Children With Cancer: A Comprehensive Reference Guide for Parents (2010) was called "Highly recommended" by Library Journal in 2010. The Journal of the Medical Library Association wrote that the format of the book "works very well" and that the references in the book are excellent. The Journal wrote that it is "an essential part of the collection of pediatric hospital libraries."

Library Journal also reviewed the 1986 edition and said Bracken gave "Good, clear overall coverage" of the topic. The Los Angeles Times wrote "Her perceptive suggestions help the reader calm the small child who is afraid of yet another need, aid the angry adolescent with a puffy face and bald head, give the exhausted parent permission to take the night off."

Bibliography

Awards

Best Editorial, Massachusetts Press Association
Best Feature article (2d and 3d prizes: New England Press Association)
Best column (2d and 3d prizes: New England Press Association)
Best column (1st prize): National Press Association
Excellence in Cancer Communications (American Cancer Society, Massachusetts Division)
New York Times Librarian Award, 2005

References

External links 

 Official site

American librarians
American women librarians
American writers
University of New Hampshire alumni
Simmons University alumni
Living people
Year of birth missing (living people)
21st-century American women